Ximen is a Chinese surname.

Ximen may also refer to:
Pedro Ximénez, a Spanish wine grape
Ximending, a commercial district in Taipei, Taiwan
Ximen metro station, a metro station in Taipei, Taiwan